{{DISPLAYTITLE:C30H44O3}}
The molecular formula C30H44O3 (molar mass: 452.67 g/mol) may refer to:

 Boldenone undecylenate, or boldenone undecenoate
 Ethandrostate, also known as ethinylandrostenediol 3β-cyclohexanepropionate

Molecular formulas